Arachnura melanura, also known as scorpion tailed orb-weaver, black tail spider and drag tail spider is a species of spider in the family Araneidae. It ranges from India to Japan to Sulawesi. It camouflages itself by mimicking fallen flowers, dead leaves and twigs. It replaces the capture spiral of its web daily.

References

Arthropods of India
Chelicerates of Japan
Spiders of Asia
Spiders described in 1867
Araneidae